Tiberian Hebrew is the canonical pronunciation of the Hebrew Bible (Tanakh) committed to writing by Masoretic scholars living in the Jewish community of Tiberias in ancient Galilee  under the Abbasid Caliphate. They wrote in the form of Tiberian vocalization, which employed diacritics added to the Hebrew letters: vowel signs and consonant diacritics (nequdot) and the so-called accents (two related systems of cantillation signs or te'amim). These together with the marginal notes masora magna and masora parva make up the Tiberian apparatus.

Though the written vowels and accents came into use in around 750 CE, the oral tradition that they reflect is many centuries older, with ancient roots.

Sources 

Today's Hebrew grammar books do not teach the Tiberian Hebrew that was described by the early grammarians. The prevailing view is that of David Qimchi's system of dividing the graphic signs into "short" and "long" vowels.

The phonology of Tiberian Hebrew can be gleaned from the collation of various sources:
 The Aleppo Codex of the Hebrew Bible and ancient manuscripts of the Tanakh cited in the margins of early codices, all which preserve direct evidence in a graphic manner of the application of vocalization rules such as the widespread use of chateph vowels where one would expect simple sheva, thus clarifying the color of the vowel pronounced under certain circumstances.
 The explicit statements found in grammars of the 10th and the 11th centuries, including the Sefer haQoloth  of Moshe ben Asher (published by N. Allony); the Sefer Dikdukei ha-Te'amim ( Grammar or Analysis of the Accents) of Aaron ben Moses ben Asher; the anonymous works entitled Horayath haQoré  (G. Khan and Ilan Eldar attribute it to the Karaite Abu Alfaraj Harun); the Treatise on the Schwa (published by Kurt Levy from a Genizah fragment in 1936), and Ma'amar haschewa  (published from Genizah material by Allony); the works of medieval Sephardi grammarians including Abraham Ibn Ezra and Judah ben David Hayyuj. In the last two, it is evident that the chain of transmission is breaking down or that their interpretations are influenced by local tradition.
 Ancient manuscripts that preserve similar dialects of Hebrew or Palestinian Aramaic but are vocalized in Tiberian signs in a "vulgar" manner and so reveal a phonetic spelling rather than a phonemic spelling.
 Other traditions such as the vocalization of the Land of Israel and (to a lesser extent) the Babylonian vocalization. Each community (Palestinian, Tiberian, Babylonian) developed systems of notation for pronunciation in each dialect, some of which are common among the traditions.
 The transcriptions of Biblical text into Arabic characters and then vocalized with Tiberian signs (by members of the Karaite community) provide an aid to pronouncing Tiberian Hebrew, especially for syllable structure and vowel length (which is marked in Arabic by matres lectionis and the sign sukun).
 Various oral traditions, especially that of Yemenite Hebrew pronunciation and the Karaite tradition, have both preserved old features that correspond to Tiberian tradition, such as the pronunciation of schwa according to its proximity to gutturals or yod.

Phonology

Consonants
Tiberian Hebrew has 29 consonantal phonemes, represented by 22 letters. The letters  (begadkefat) had two values each: plosive and fricative.

The following are the most salient characteristics of the Tiberian Hebrew consonantal pronunciation:

 The threefold pronunciation of Resh . Even though there is no agreement as to how it was pronounced, the rules of distribution of such pronunciation is given in  Horayath haQoré:
 "Normal" Resh  pronounced thus (according to Eldar, as a uvular sound ) in all other instances (except for the circumstances described below):  
 The "peculiar" resh  before or after Lamed or Nun, any of the three being vocalized with simple sheva and Resh after Zayin , Daleth , Samekh , Sin , Taw , Tzadi , Teth , any of them punctuated with simple sheva:  ,  . Because of the proximity of a dental consonant, it is likely that Resh was  then pronounced as an alveolar trill, as it still is in Sephardi Hebrew.
 There is still another pronunciation, affected by the addition of a dagesh in the Resh in certain words in the Bible, which indicates it was doubled :  . As can be seen, this pronunciation has to do with the progressive increase in length of this consonant. It was preserved only by the population of Ma'azya (מעזיה), which is in Tiberias.
 A possible threefold pronunciation of Taw ת. There are three words in the Torah, Prophets, and Writings in which it is said that "the Taw is pronounced harder than usual". It is said that this pronunciation was halfway between the soft Taw ת  and the hard Taw תּ :

Vowels 

marginal

The vowel qualities  have phonemic status:  (Lev. 5:19) and  'guilty',  'when' and  'mother'.  has phonemic value in final stressed position , but in other positions, it may reflect loss of the opposition : . By the Tiberian period, all short vowels in stressed syllables had lengthened, making vowel length allophonic.

The Tiberian tradition possesses three reduced (ultrashort, hatuf) vowels  of which  has questionable phonemicity. , under a non-guttural letter, was pronounced as an ultrashort copy of the following vowel before a guttural and as  preceding ,. However, it was always pronounced as  under gutturals:  .

Stress 
Tiberian Hebrew has phonemic stress (  'they built' vs.   'in us'). Stress is most commonly ultimate, less commonly penultimate, and rarely antepenultimate stress:   'into the tent'.

Phonotactics 
As described above, vowel length is dependent on syllable structure. Open syllables must take long or ultrashort vowels; stressed closed syllables take long vowels; unstressed closed syllables take short vowels. Traditional Hebrew philology considers ultrashort vowels not to be syllable nuclei.

Orthography 

The simple sheva sign changes its pronunciation depending on its position in the word (mobile/vocal or quiescent/zero) and its proximity to certain consonants.

In these examples, it has been preferred to show one in the Bible and represents each phenomenon in a graphic manner (a chateph vowel), but the rules still apply when there is only a simple sheva (depending on the manuscript or edition used).

When the simple sheva appears in any of the following positions, it is regarded as mobile (na):

 At the beginning of a word, which includes the sheva (originally the first of the word) following the attached particles bi-,ki-,li- and u- and preceded by metheg (the vertical line placed to the left of the vowel sign, which stands for either secondary stress or its lengthening). Examples:   Genesis 2:12;   Psalms 74:5. But is not pronounced if there is no metheg; that is, they form a closed syllable.
 The sheva following these three vowels , except for known types of closed syllables (and preceded or not, by metheg). Examples:   Exodus 3:18;   Exodus 4:18.
 The second of two adjacent shevas, when both appear under different consonants. Examples:   Jeremiah 31:33;   Jeremiah 32:9 (except for at the end of a word).
 The sheva under the first of two identical consonants, preceded by metheg. Examples:   Gen. 14:7;   Exodus: 15:10.
 The sheva under a consonant with dagesh forte or lene. Examples:   Isaiah 9:3;   Ezekiel 17:23.
 The sheva under a consonant that expects gemination but is not so marked, for example, the one found under . And sometimes even  when preceded by the article. Examples:   Genesis 12:3;   2 Chronicles 33:18.
 In case a quiescent sheva was followed either by a guttural or yodh, it would turn into mobile according to the rules given below, if preceded by a metheg. Ancient manuscripts support that view. Examples:   Proverbs 28:22;   Job 1:3.
 Any sheva, if the sign metheg is attached to it, would change an ultrashort vowel to a short, or normal length vowel. For this, only ancient, reliable manuscripts can give us a clear picture, since, with time, later vocalizers added to the number of methegs found in the Bible.

The gutturals, and yodh, affect the pronunciation of the sheva preceding them. The allophones of the phoneme  follow these two rules:

 It would change its sound to imitate that of the following guttural.   Numbers 3:17;   Numbers 5:28.
 It would be pronounced as ḥireq before consonantal yodh. Examples:   Jeremiah 21:1;   in Maimonides' autograph in his commentary to the Mishnah.

It must be said that even though there are no special signs apart  to denote the full range of furtive vowels, the remaining four are represented by simple sheva (ḥaṭaf ḥiriq in the Aleppo Codex is a scribal oddity and certainly not regular in Hebrew manuscripts with Tiberian vocalization).

This last case has similarities with phenomena occurring in the Samaritan pronunciation and the Phoenician language.

Depending on the school of pronunciation (and relying on musical grounds, perhaps), the metheg sign served to change some closed syllables into open ones, and therefore, changing the vowel from short to long, and the quiescent sheva, into a mobile one.

That is referenced specifically by medieval grammarians:

The names of the vowel diacritics are iconic and show some variation:

Notes

References

Bibliography 
 

 
 
 
 
 
 
 
 
 

Language of the Hebrew Bible
Medieval languages
Extinct languages of Asia